Francesco di Marco Datini (c. 1335 – 16 August 1410) was an Italian merchant born in Prato. Datini is notable for having implemented the first partnership system in business in 1383.

Biography
Datini was one of four children of Marco di Datino and Monna Vermiglia, who, along with two of their children, both died as a result of the Black Death in 1348.

After his parents' death, he was raised by a woman whom he called his "substitute mother." Their relationship seems to have been a positive one. There is a letter from her signed, "Your mother in love."

Datini became an apprentice of a merchant in Florence. In 1358, he joined a group of merchants who were going to Avignon, the city to which the papacy had moved at the time. Datini stayed in Avignon until 1382. His first business was in the arms trade, which was quite profitable in Avignon during the Hundred Years' War. He eventually became a supplier of luxury goods and art for the wealthy cardinals residing there. The works of art that these figures bought were some of the first consumed for private, non-religious use. Before this time, the church had been the primary patron of the arts. Later on, the papacy and other pious individuals commissioned religious artwork, creating a use for Francesco's merchant skills. He was not interested in the product itself, but rather in whether its quality would please his buyers. The purchase of artwork by individuals was a growing trend going into the Renaissance.

In 1376, Datini entered into an engagement with Margherita Bandini, the daughter of Domenico Bandini and Dianora Gheradini. Margherita was living in Avignon with her mother after her father was executed for his role in an anti-republican plot and her brothers were exiled. The couple returned to live in Prato in 1382, where Datini's business continued to thrive. In 1386, he moved to Florence, where he stayed until his death 1410.

As thus Datini spent long periods of time away from Prato, where his wife continued to  live, over the next 27 years, the couple frequently corresponded through letters. These letters give us insight into their marriage, Datini's personality and business, and Margherita's management of the household. From June 1400 to September 1401, the two, along with Datini's illegitimate daughter Ginevra, fled from Prato to Bologna in fear of the Black Death. Datini returned to die a natural death in 1410.

In 1870, 500 account books and 150,000 papers relating to Datini's business were discovered in a stairwell of the couple's mansion in Prato.  These papers provide insight into both Datini's business as well as the merchant class in general as it existed in the fourteenth and fifteenth centuries.

Datini is buried in the church of San Francesco in Prato. His tomb's marble slab was designed by Niccolò di Piero Lamberti. As Datini had no legitimate or male heirs, he left the bulk of his fortune to a charitable foundation established in his name, the "Casa del Ceppo dei poveri di Francesco di Marco," which still exists today.

Further reading
 Origo, Iris (1957): The Merchant of Prato: Francesco di Marco Datini,  (2002 reprint)

See also
Madonna del Ceppo, a painting by Filippo Lippi depicting him
Prato

Notes

References
 Joshua Brown (2017): Early Evidence for Tuscanisation in the Letters of Milanese Merchants in the Datini Archive, Prato, 1396-1402, Milan, Istituto Lombardo Accademia di Scienze e Lettere (online).
 Franz-Josef Arlinghaus (2000): Zwischen Notiz und Bilanz. Zur Eigendynamik des Schriftgebrauchs in der kaufmännischen Buchführung am Beispiel der Datini/di Berto-Handlungsgesellschaft in Avignon (1367–1373), PhD, Münster 1996, Frankfurt (in part online).
 Joseph Patrik Byrne: Francesco Datini, „father of many“: piety, charity and patronage in early modern Tuscany, PhD 1989, Indiana University, Bloomington 1995.
 Joseph Patrik Byrne/Eleanor A. Congdon: Mothering in Casa Datini, in: Journal of Medieval History 25/1 (1999), pp 35–56.
 Elena Cecchi (1990): Le lettere di Francesco Datini alla moglie Margherita (1385–1410), Prato.
 Elena Cecchi Aste (2004): L'Archivio di Francesco di Marco Datini. Fondaco di Avignone. Inventario, Rome.
Chatfield, Michael (1996): "Datini, Francesco de Marco (1335-1410". In History of Accounting: An International Encyclopedia, edited by Michael Chatfield and Richard Vangermeersch. New York: Garland Publishing, pp. 187–188.
 Martin Malcolm Elbl (2007): From Venice to the Tuat: Trans-Saharan Copper Trade and Francesco di Marco Datini of Prato, in: Money, Markets and Trade in Late Medieval Europe: Essays in Honour of John H. A. Munro, Brill, Leiden, pp 411–459.
 Luciana Frangioni (1994): Milano fine Trecento. Il carteggio milanese dell’Archivio Datini di Prato, Opus libri, Florence.
 Hans-Jürgen Hübner/Ludolf Kuchenbuch (2004): Schrift, Geld und Zeit. Francesco Datinis Wechselbrief vom 18. 12. 1399 im Kontext seiner Buchhaltung, in: Alteuropäische Schriftkultur, Kurseinheit 5: Von der Bibel zur Bibliothek. Sieben Fallstudien zu Profil und Entwicklung der Schriftkultur im Mittelalter, FernUniversität Hagen, pp 115–137.
 Carolyn James and Antonio Pagliaro (translated by:)(2012) "Letters to Francesco Datini by Margherita Datini". CRRS, Toronto.
Giampiero Nigro, ed. (2010): Francesco di Marco Datini: The Man, The Merchant. Florence: Firenze University Press—Fondazione Istituto Internazionale di Storia Economica "F. Datini".
 Giampiero Nigro (2003): Mercanti in Maiorca. Il carteggio datiniano dall'isola (1387–1396), Florence.
Origo, Iris (1957): Merchant of Prato: Francesco di Marco Datini.
 Diana Toccafondi/Giovanni Tartaglione ed. (2002): Per la tua Margherita… Lettere di una donna del ’300 al marito mercante. Margherita Datini e Francesco di Marco 1384–1401, CD-ROM, Archivio di Stato di Prato, Prato.

External links

Francesco Datini
Datini's Palace
Datini's Archive
Francesco Datini

1335 births
1410 deaths
People from Prato
Italian philanthropists
14th-century Italian businesspeople
15th-century Italian businesspeople